Optimus, also known as Tesla Bot, is a conceptual general-purpose robotic humanoid under development by Tesla, Inc. It was announced at the company's Artificial Intelligence (AI) Day event on August 19, 2021. CEO Elon Musk claimed during the event that Tesla would likely build a prototype by 2022. Musk is on record having said that he thinks Optimus "has the potential to be more significant than the vehicle business over time."

History 
On April 7, 2022, a display for the product was featured at the Tesla Giga Texas manufacturing facility during the Cyber Rodeo event. Musk said that he hopes to have the robot production-ready by 2023 and claimed Optimus will eventually be able to do "anything that humans don’t want to do." 

In June 2022, Musk announced the display model at (AI) Day event and the Giga Texas opening will not look anything like the first prototype that Tesla hopes to unveil later in 2022.

In September 2022, semi-functional prototypes of Optimus were displayed at Tesla's second AI Day. One prototype was able to walk about the stage and another, sleeker version could move its arms.

Specifications 
Proposed tasks for the product are ones that are "dangerous, repetitive and boring", such as providing manufacturing assistance.

Reception

Initial reactions 
Soon after the event, many publications reacted with skepticism about the proposed product. Bloomberg News claimed that such a product constituted "mission creep" and stood outside "the company’s clean-energy initiatives." The Washington Post argued that "Tesla has a history of exaggerating timelines and overpromising at its product unveilings and investor presentations." The Verge similarly noted that "Tesla’s history is littered with fanciful ideas that never panned out... it’s anyone’s guess as to whether a working Tesla Bot will ever see the light of day" and, in an editorial, described the Tesla Bot reveal as a "bizarre and brilliant bit of tomfoolery".

The progress made with the prototypes shown at the second AI Day was praised by some commentators. Other commentators stipulated that all that was shown in these latest presentations had already been accomplished by other robotics programs, and that there appears to be little to suggest Tesla could "outpace other companies working on similar things."

Expert opinions 
Carl Berry, a lecturer of robotics engineering, described the AI Day presentation as "the usual overblown hype." Following the Tesla Bot display at the Cyber Rodeo event, scientist Gary Marcus stated he would "bet that no robot will be able to do all human tasks by the end of 2023."

Deutsche Welle cited experts who called it a "complete and utter scam", questioned how advanced it really was, and criticized the choice of a humanoid form.

References 

Tesla, Inc.
Robotic manipulation